HMS Phoenix was an Acheron-class destroyer of the British Royal Navy. She is named for the mythical bird, and was the fifteenth ship of the Royal Navy to bear the name.  She was the only British warship ever to be sunk by the Austro-Hungarian Navy.

Pennant Numbers

Design
Fourteen destroyers were ordered for the Royal Navy to the standard Admiralty design, with six more as 'builder's specials', to the design of specialist destroyer shipyards, later followed by three more high-speed specials and six for Australia.

Displacement was about  legend and } deep load. Three Yarrow water-tube boilers fed steam to Parsons steam turbines which drove three shafts. Two funnels were fitted.

The ships were armed with two 4-inch (102 mm) BL Mk VIII on the centreline and two 12-pounder 12 cwt guns on the ship's beam. Two single 21-inch (533 mm) torpedo tubes were fitted. The ships had a complement of 72 men.

Phoenix was laid down at Vickers' Barrow-in-Furness shipyard on 4 January 1911, was launched on 9 October 1911 and was completed in May 1912.

Career
At the beginning of the First World War, Phoenix was part of the First Destroyer Flotilla operating in the North Sea. She and her sisters were attached to the Grand Fleet as soon as the war started.

Action on 16 August 1914
On 16 August 1914, within days of the outbreak of war, the First Destroyer Flotilla engaged an enemy cruiser off the mouth of the Elbe, which is reported with great verve by an author writing under the pseudonym "Clinker Knocker" in 1938:

The Battle of Heligoland Bight
She was present with First Destroyer Flotilla on 28 August 1914 at the Battle of Heligoland Bight, led by the light cruiser Fearless. Phoenix suffered one man wounded during the action

The Battle of Dogger Bank
On 24 January 1915 Phoenix took part in the Battle of Dogger Bank, and her crew shared in the Prize Money for the German armoured cruiser Blücher.

The Battle of Jutland
Phoenix was not present with her flotilla at the Battle of Jutland on 31 May 1916.

HMAT Ballarat
Phoenix was escorting the Australian troopship Ballarat when she was attacked by a German submarine on Anzac Day (25 April) 1917 in the English Channel.  Although efforts were made to tow Ballarat to shallow water, she sank off The Lizard the following morning. No people died of the 1,752 souls on board, a striking testament to the calmness and discipline of the troops.

Mediterranean Service
In September 1917, Phoenix transferred to the Fifth Destroyer Flotilla which was operating in the Mediterranean.  This posting was to be her last.

Loss
At 9:18 on 14 May 1918, while patrolling the Otranto Barrage, the Phoenix was torpedoed amidships by the Austro-Hungarian submarine , at position . HMAS Warrego made an unsuccessful attempt to tow her to Valona (now Vlorë in Albania), but she sank within sight of the port at 13:10 in position . The crew had been taken off before she capsized, and there were only two fatalities; a Leading Stoker and an Engine Room Artificer.

References

Acheron-class destroyers of the Royal Navy
Ships built in Barrow-in-Furness
1911 ships
World War I destroyers of the United Kingdom
Maritime incidents in 1918
Ships sunk by Austro-Hungarian submarines
World War I shipwrecks in the Mediterranean Sea